The Far-Out Son of Lung and the Ramblings of a Madman is an EP which was released by Future Sound of London in 1995 to promote the album ISDN. Unlike the band's other EPs, there are no variations on a theme here, simply album versions of the tracks segued together in a new way.  The only exception is Snake Hips, which appears in an extended version sometimes referred to as "Snake Hips (Parts 1 & 2)".

Track listing
 "Far-Out Son of Lung and the Ramblings of a Madman" – 4:41
 "Snake Hips" – 8:33
 "Smokin' Japanese Babe" – 5:42
 "Amoeba" – 5:00

Chart Position

Crew
Written, produced and performed by FSOL.
Artwork by Buggy G. Riphead and FSOL.
The man depicted on the cover and in album artwork is "Vit", the Chinese restaurateur down the street from FSOL's studio.

References

External links
 

1995 EPs
The Future Sound of London EPs
Astralwerks EPs